Primula florindae, the Tibetan cowslip or giant cowslip, is a species of flowering plant in the family Primulaceae, native to southeastern Tibet, where it grows in huge numbers close to rivers such as the Tsangpo. They bear clusters of 20–40 yellow, pendent, bell-like, delicately scented flowers with a mealy white bloom.

The plant was first collected for western horticulture in 1924 by the British botanist Frank Kingdon-Ward, and was named after his wife Florinda.

This plant grows best in very moist conditions as its home is the margins of rivers. It is cold-hardy as long as its roots are not allowed to dry out.

It has gained the Royal Horticultural Society's Award of Garden Merit.

References

Flora of Tibet
florindae